Women Of Aviation Worldwide Week {WOAW} is a global aviation awareness week for girls of all ages observed to mark the anniversary of the world’s first female pilot licence (March 8, 1910). The week is a call to address gender imbalance in the air and space industry. It is not country or group specific

Since March 2010, Women Of Aviation Worldwide Week's activities have been organized in 52 countries on 5 continents. 420,000 women and girls attended the Week's local hands-on activities. 69,768 women and girls experienced their first flight in a small aircraft in response to the Week's Fly It Forward® call to action.

History
In January 2010, Mireille Goyer, an airline-rated pilot and aviation educator, launched an international grassroots initiative to celebrate the centennial of the first female pilot license worldwide earned by Raymonde de Laroche on March 8, 1910.

Her Fly It Forward® call to action encouraged pilots from around the world to introduce record numbers of girls of any age to aviation during, what was then dubbed, "Women Pilots' Week". In 2011, the one-time celebration evolved into the annual "Women Of Aviation Worldwide Week".

By addressing the female population's lack of exposure to aviation activities, Goyer's Fly It Forward® initiative aims to fulfill the dream of the pioneering women pilots of 1910, namely to see women participate in all aspects of aviation.

On September 10, 2012, Mireille Goyer founded the Institute for Women Of Aviation Worldwide (iWOAW), a not-for-profit global industry alliance. It organizes The Week's various contests and tracks The Week's activities in addition to managing other initiatives that facilitate women's integration in the industry around the year. Led by a gender-balanced, all-volunteer, Board of Directors, iWOAW's mission is to foster gender balance in the air and space industry through outreach, education, and advocacy.

Activities and observances

Female-centric activities take place at airports and aerodromes around the world as well as in museums and aerospace businesses. Special commemoration flights are often conducted.

iWOAW organizes multiple challenges and contests during the week. The best known challenge, Fly It Forward®, rewards top performers with awards including "Most Female Friendly Airport Worldwide", "Most Female Friendly Community Worldwide", "Most Female Friendly Corporation Worldwide", "Most Dedicated Female Pilot Worldwide", and "Most Supportive Male Pilot Worldwide".

Theme
Each year, a theme based on a global historical female breakthrough in the air and space industry highlights a specific sector of the industry.

List of themes (2010-2018)
 2010 – 100 years of licensed female pilots (world’s first female pilot license – Raymonde de Laroche, France)
 2011 – 100 years of female air racers (world first women to enter an air race – Hélène Dutrieu, Belgium
 2012 – 100 years of female seaplane pilots (world’s first seaplane pilot – Hélène Dutrieu, Belgium)
 2013 – 50 years of women in space (world's first female astronaut – Valentina Tereshkova, Russia)
 2014 – 100 years of female aerobatic pilots (world's first female aerobatic pilot – Lydia Zvereva, Russia)
 2015 – 100 years of female pilots in combat (world's first woman to fly in combat – Marie Marvingt, France)
 2016 – 60 years of female bush pilots (world's first female bush pilot – Ada Rogato, Brazil)
 2017 – 80 years of female helicopter pilots (world's first female helicopter pilot – Hanna Reitsch, Germany)
 2018 - 65 years of supersonic women (world's first woman to fly at the speed of sound - Jacqueline Cochran, USA)

List of Fly It Forward® Award Winners

References

External links
 Women of Aviation Worldwide Week website
 Institute for Women of Aviation Worldwide Week website

March observances
Awareness weeks